Émile Thielens (1854–1911) was a Belgian architect. He designed the Queen Elisabeth Hall, Café-restaurant Paon Royal, and buildings at the Antwerp Zoo.

References

1854 births
1911 deaths
Belgian architects